M15 or M-15 may refer to:

In science
 Messier 15 (M15), a globular cluster in the constellation Pegasus

In firearms and military equipment
 M15 mine, a United States anti-tank mine
 M15 rifle, a variant of the M14, a United States military rifle
 Grigorovich M-15, a Russian World War I-era biplane flying boat
 M15 pistol, a General Officer's variant of the M1911A1
 M15 Half-track
 M15/42 tank, an Italian medium tank

In transportation
 M-15 (Michigan highway), a highway in the lower peninsula of Michigan, US
 M15 motorway (Hungary), a motorway in Hungary
 M15 road (East London), a Metropolitan Route in East London, South Africa
 M15 (Cape Town), a Metropolitan Route in Cape Town, South Africa
 M15 road (Pretoria), a Metropolitan Route in Pretoria, South Africa
 M15 road (Durban), a Metropolitan Route in Durban, South Africa
 M15 road (Bloemfontein), a Metropolitan Route in Bloemfontein, South Africa
 M15 (Port Elizabeth), a Metropolitan Route in Port Elizabeth, South Africa
The Hunter Expressway in New South Wales, Australia
 M15 motorway (Great Britain), an unbuilt motorway in London
 M15 (New York City bus), a New York City Bus route in Manhattan, US
 , a New York City Bus route in Manhattan, US
 Noble M15, a British sport car built by Noble Automotive Ltd
 FAA location identifier for James Tucker Airport, a rural airport in Linden, Tennessee, US
 GER Class M15, a class of British 2-4-2T steam locomotive
 WSK-Mielec PZL M-15 Belphegor, a Polish-designed jet-engined agricultural biplane
M15 fuel mixed with 15% of methanol
M15 Road (Zambia), a road in Zambia

In sports
 Markku Uusipaavalniemi (nicknamed "M-15"), a Finnish curler

In computing
 An ergonomic model of IBM's Model M keyboard, produced in the mid-1990s.

See also
 15-M, Anti-austerity movement in Spain
 MI5, the United Kingdom's counter-intelligence and security agency
 Shorthand for Model 15
 Magic 2015, a Magic: The Gathering expansion set